The Island Line Trail, also known as the Colchester Causeway, is a  rail trail located in northwest Vermont. It comprises the Burlington Bike Path (Burlington), Colchester Park (Colchester) and the Allen Point Access Area (South Hero). The trail follows the route of the Island Line railroad, built by the Rutland Railroad in 1901.

There is a  gap in the causeway that allows boat traffic to cross. A donation-based ferry operates in the summer months carrying trail users over the gap.

History

The history of the Rutland Railroad is covered in Robert C. Jones'  "Railroads of Vermont, Volume 2" and in Jim Shaughnessy's "The Rutland Railroad", Howell-North Books, 1964.

Passenger service on the Rutland's Island Line (and on the entire Rutland RR system) ended after a strike by employees in late June, 1953. A second set of strikes, in 1960 and 1961, brought about the complete closure of the Rutland Railroad. The final trains ran on September 25, 1961. In 1963, the state of Vermont purchased the abandoned, but not torn-up, Rutland Railroad lines from Burlington to Rutland, North Bennington, Hoosick Junction and Bellows Falls, leasing them to the Vermont Railway and the Green Mountain Railroad to resume freight service, but the state chose not to acquire and reopen the Island Line.

There was little on-line traffic left on that portion of the route, and freight for Canada could be routed from Burlington north to Montreal over the somewhat-longer Central Vermont Railway through St. Albans, Vermont. After several years of inactivity, restoring service on the Island Line would have required extensive rebuilding, and renovations of the three swing bridges on the line over various bays of Lake Champlain. Ultimately, all of the swing bridges on the route were removed, but the roadbed on the causeway across the lake survived, as it was heavily built with much use of granite and marble tailings. The alignment along the shores of Lake Champlain from Burlington Union Station north to the causeway was converted to form the Burlington Bike Path, and later took the Island Line name when the causeway was reopened, with a seasonal bike-ferry replacing the swing bridge in the northern portion of the causeway alignment.  Due to a  gap in the causeway, the organization Local Motion operates the Island Line Bike Ferry to shuttle cyclists across the gap.

Recent developments
The trail was closed after Labor Day weekend in 2019 so that nearly $2 million in upgrades and repairs could be made, due to damage caused in May, 2019, when the trail experienced 70 mile-per-hour winds and 7-foot waves.  Trail reopening occurred in May, 2020.

A helicopter crashed into the causeway on July 30, 2021, closing the trail for three hours. The lone pilot escaped the wreckage and was taken to UVM Medical Center with minor to moderate injuries.

References

External links 
 
 Trail Link

Rail trails in Vermont
Protected areas of Chittenden County, Vermont
Geography of Grand Isle County, Vermont
National Recreation Trails in Vermont